Nathanael Fouquet (born 23 July 1972) is a French slalom canoeist who competed at the international level from 1988 to 2002.

He won a gold medal in the C2 team event at the 2002 ICF Canoe Slalom World Championships in Bourg St.-Maurice. He also won a silver and a bronze in the same event at the European Championships.

His partner in the C2 boat throughout his active career was Alexandre Lauvergne.

World Cup individual podiums

References

French male canoeists
Living people
1972 births
Medalists at the ICF Canoe Slalom World Championships